Patrick Levaye (born July 26, 1952 in Orléans, in Loiret) is a writer and a French Senior official. Author of a book on Catholicism, Patrick Levaye occupied several functions with high responsibilities with the French Minister of the Interior, with the Minister of Defence like to the Secretariat of State to the War Veterans. He was member of the Rally for the Republic (RPR), a French right-wing political party, during about fifteen years, as from 1979. He is also knight of the Sovereign Military Order of Malta, delegated hospital works for the 12th arrondissement of Paris since the beginning of the years 2000, and reserve officer.

Biography
He is born in Orléans, in Loiret, on July 26, 1952. Only sons of a family of the middle-class, he followed, in Puteaux (Hauts-de-Seine), a schooling without difficulty until the scientific baccalaureat. After having obtained this diploma, in 1969 with the Mention Assez Bien (Honours), Patrick Levaye carried out a preparation in agronomy and was acceptable with a veterinary contest. He decided, finally, to turn to studies of botany. He obtained its licence of botany.

Levaye, who wished to carry out a professional path in the public office, decided to present himself to the contest of the Regional Institute of French Administration (RIFA), which he makes a success of in 1975. Left graduate RIFA from Metz in 1977, Patrick Levaye carried out his military service (which was, let us recall it, at the time, obligatory) with Paris Fire Brigade. After his military service, he entered to the Minister of the Economy, Industry and Employment (France), with the Management of the Forecast, as attache with the Central Administration.

In 1982, he entered to the École nationale d'administration (ENA), in promotion "Leonardo da Vinci". In this promotion was also admitted, at the sides of Patrick Levaye, Richard Descoings (director of the Paris Institute of Political Studies), Patrick Galouzeau de Villepin (brother of the former French Prime Minister Dominique de Villepin), François Peny (General secretary of préfecture of the Gironde), Jean-François Cirelli (president of Gaz de France), Jean-Claude Mallet (former General secretary of French National defense), so on.

Following obtaining the diploma of the ENA, in 1985, Patrick Levaye carried out a career of senior official "interesting" and "exemplary", according to the terms of some of his former comrades of promotion.

Administrative Functions and occupied Policies
 1979 - 1982 : Attache, with the Central Administration, within the Management of the Forecast (Minister of the Economy, Industry and Employment (France)); 
 1982 - 1985 : Student at the École nationale d'administration, promotion "Leonardo da Vinci"; 
 1985 - 1989 : Civil administrator with the Head office of the National Police Force (Minister of the Interior (France)) ;
 1989 - 1992 : General Secretary of the Prefecture of the Tarn-et-Garonne ;
 1992 - 1994 : Head clerk of the Budgetary Businesses to the French Minister of the Interior ;
 1994 - 1999 : Sub-manager of the administration and modernization to the direction of defense and safety civil (French Minister of the Interior) ; 
 1999 - 2002 : Sub-manager of the Budget to the Prefecture of Police ; 
 2002 - 2007 : Adviser of the Minister of Defence (France), Michèle Alliot-Marie ;
 2002 - 2003 : Technical adviser with the cabinet of the Secretary of State to Defence charged with War Veterans, Hamlaoui Mekachera ;
 2003 - February 2007 : Director-assistant of the cabinet of the Secretariat of State to Defence charged with War Veterans ; 
 February 2007 - May 2007 : Principal private secretary of the Secretariat of State to Defence charged with War Veterans ;
 September 2007 - June 2008 : Rapporteur at the Commission of White paper on Defence and the French National Security ;
 January 2009 - June 2012 : Project Manager on the "Securities Secure" to the French Ministry of Interior ;
 Since July 2012 : Deputy Ministerial Delegate to Private Security (MDPS) to the French Ministry of Interior.

Literary works
 Charles de Foucauld : Repères pour Aujourd'hui (Première Partie Editions, December 2016 - ) ;
 Géopolitique du Catholicisme (Ellipses Editions, 2007 - ).

Honorary Distinctions
 Knight of the Ordre National du Mérite ;
 Knight of the Mérite Agricole ;
 Knight of the Sovereign Military Order of Malta.

External links
 Patrick Levaye's Book, Charles de Foucauld : Repères pour Aujourd'hui, on the Première Partie Website ;
 The Official Website of White paper on Defence and the National Security (France) ;
 The Official Website of the Minister of Defence (France) ;
 The Official Website of the Minister of the Interior (France) ;
 The Official Website of the Sovereign Military Order of Malta.

1952 births
Living people
École nationale d'administration alumni
Knights of Malta
Knights of the Order of Agricultural Merit